Typhoon Nora, known in the Philippines as Typhoon Luming, was the fourth-most intense tropical cyclone on record. Originating from an area of low pressure over the western Pacific, Nora was first identified as a tropical depression on October 2, 1973. Tracking generally westward, the system gradually intensified, attaining typhoon status the following evening. After turning northwestward, the typhoon underwent a period of rapid intensification, during which its central pressure decreased by 77 mb (hPa; 2.27 inHg) in 24 hours. The typhoon subsequently weakened and turned northwestward as it approached the Philippines. After brushing Luzon on October 7, the system passed south of Taiwan and ultimately made landfall in China on October 10. Once onshore, Nora quickly weakened and dissipated the following day.

The Philippines and Taiwan sustained the most extensive losses from Typhoon Nora, with 36 people dying collectively. In the former, more than 1 million residents were left homeless as high winds and flooding wrecked homes. Damage in the country reached $2 million (1973 USD). In Taiwan, more than 1,000 homes were destroyed and 8,000 people were left homeless. The typhoon was also responsible for several maritime incidents that killed at least four people.

Meteorological history

On September 30, a weak surface low developed within the monsoon trough about 195 km (120 mi) south of Yap. Drifting northwestward, the system gradually organized into a tropical depression by October 2. Later that day, aircraft reconnaissance revealed the system to have intensified into a tropical storm, at which time it was assigned the name Nora. The system's movement soon became slow and erratic, with Nora executing a counter-clockwise loop on October 3. After completing the loop, it attained typhoon status and acquired a temporary northward trajectory. Due to the cyclone's proximity to the Philippines, the Philippine Atmospheric, Geophysical and Astronomical Services Administration also monitored the storm and assigned it with the local name Luming. Late on October 4, Nora began to undergo a period of rapid intensification. Several aircraft reconnaissance missions were flown by the U.S. Air Force 54th Weather Reconnaissance Squadron into the storm between October 5 and 6, documenting the typhoon's dramatic strengthening.

Initially, the aircraft was unable to penetrate into the core of the eye due to severe turbulence; however, they were successful after a second attempt. Once inside the eye, they discovered an almost cloud-free center with "an amphitheater or bowl-like appearance." The core of Nora was exceptionally warm, with temperatures reaching a near-record  at the 700 mb level. At 0020 UTC on October 6, a dropsonde released by the reconnaissance team recorded a surface pressure of 877 mb (hPa; 25.91 inHg) just inside the eyewall of the typhoon. This intensity ranked Nora as the most-intense tropical cyclone on record in the world, alongside Typhoon Ida in 1958. However, in post-storm analysis, it was noted that since the dropsonde did not record a pressure at the storm's center, Nora was likely slightly stronger than indicated. Since then, Nora's intensity has been surpassed by three other storms: Typhoon June in 1975, Typhoon Tip in 1979, and Hurricane Patricia in 2015.

Despite the storm's extreme intensity, it quickly began to weaken as it approached the Philippines on October 6. Within ten hours, the pressure rose to 894 mb (hPa; 26.40 inHg) and later dropped below Category 5 status. That morning, Nora turned more northwesterly in response to a weakening in a subtropical ridge and an approaching shortwave trough over China. Steady weakening continued over the following days, with the storm brushing the northeastern tip of Luzon, Philippines, with winds of 175–185 km/h (110–115 mph) on October 7. After passing within 95 km (60 mi) of Taiwan, Nora turned more northerly before making landfall near Xiamen, Fujian as a minimal typhoon early on October 10. Once onshore, the storm rapidly degenerated into an area of low pressure before dissipating the following day.

Preparations and impact

Prior to the typhoon's arrival in the Philippines, all domestic flights in and out of Manila were cancelled; however, international travel was unaffected. The United States Air Force also moved its planes from Clark Air Base to other bases in Asia. Additionally, all schools in Manila were closed. Brushing the coast of Luzon in the Philippines as a Category 3-equivalent typhoon, Nora caused considerable damage in the region. These winds caused scattered power and communication losses throughout the Peninsula. The city of Baguio (population 100,000) lost power for approximately six hours. Crop losses were extensive, with the storm striking close to harvest time. Eight towns along a 45 km (30 mi) stretch downstream were flooded; however, roads remained passable. Flooding in Manila also prompted the evacuation of 400 residents. In Caloocan, a child died after being electrocuted by downed wires. Across the Philippines, 24 people were killed and over 1 million were left homeless. Damage to crops and property reached $2 million (1973 USD). Nora was the first of three typhoons to impact the Philippines in the span of a week, with Patsy and Ruth striking the country on October 12 and 15 respectively.

While passing south of Taiwan, rough seas spawned by the typhoon were responsible for several maritime incidents over the Taiwan Strait and South China Sea. The Philippine Freighter Asian Mariner, though all 38 crewmen were rescued. The Greek freighter Baltic Klif capsized about 150 km (90 mi) southwest of the Penghu Islands, with three crewmen confirmed dead and several others missing and presumed dead. Additionally, the Taiwanese fishing vessel Jai Tai NR3 became stranded amid  seas, with its bow split open. One of the crew perished; however, the frigate USS Worden was able to rescue seven fishermen despite the dangerous seas. As the storm neared landfall in China, two ships became stranded over the South China Sea and sent out distress signals.

Passing within 95 km (60 mi) of Taiwan, the storm brought gale-force winds and torrential rain to the island. Widespread flooding and many landslides destroyed at least 1,000 homes, and washed out bridges, roads, and railroads. Twelve people died and twenty-eight others were reported missing. Additionally, 8,000 people were left homeless. Although Nora struck China as a typhoon, there were no reports of damage received.

See also

1973 Pacific typhoon season
List of the most intense tropical cyclones
Typhoon Tip
Typhoon Ida (1958)

References

External links
Japan Meteorological Agency
Joint Typhoon Warning Center 

1973 Pacific typhoon season
Typhoons in China
Typhoons in Taiwan
Typhoons
1973 in China
1973 in the Philippines
Typhoons in Hong Kong
Typhoons in the Philippines
1973 disasters in Asia